Jason Durr (born 2 December 1967) is an English actor (although he also holds an Irish passport) of theatre, television and film. After training at LAMDA he began his career with The Royal Shakespeare Company, later making his television debut as Alex Hartman in 1990 in the sci-fi drama Jupiter Moon, he went on to star as Mike Bradley in the Yorkshire-based police drama series Heartbeat from 1997 until 2003. Between 2016 and 2023, he appeared in the medical drama series Casualty as David Hide.

Life and career
Durr was born on 2 December 1967 in Singapore. After leaving Leighton Park School, Durr trained at LAMDA and then worked with the Royal Shakespeare Company with director Trevor Nunn. From 1997 to 2003, he starred as Mike Bradley in the Yorkshire-based police drama series Heartbeat. Durr has three children with his wife, TV presenter and garden designer, Kate Charman, who he married in 2004. In 2009, he appeared in a two-part British television drama, Above Suspicion. He received favourable reviews for his performance as murder suspect Alan Daniels.

In 2012, Durr starred as Guy Littleton in Noël Coward's Volcano, opposite Jenny Seagrove at the Vaudeville Theatre in London's West End. In February 2014, Durr starred in the Michael Frayn production of Donkeys Years at the Rose Theatre in Kingston. Then in March 2014, he appeared in The Mummy opposite Susie Amy at the Belgrade Theatre and then on a national tour. In 2016, he joined the cast of the BBC medical drama series Casualty as Clinical Nurse Manager David Hide. In October 2022, Durr announced he was leaving Casualty after six years.

Filmography

References

External links
 

1967 births
English male television actors
English male film actors
English male stage actors
English male Shakespearean actors
Living people
Royal Shakespeare Company members
People educated at Leighton Park School